Kulhuse is a town in the Frederikssund Municipality in North Zealand, Denmark. As of 2022, it has a population of 878.

It is a popular vacation destination, especially in the summer.

References 

Cities and towns in the Capital Region of Denmark
Frederikssund Municipality